Jinbo(-)dang, literally Progressive Party may also refer to:

 Progressive Party (South Korea), political party from 1956 to 1958.
 Youth Progressive Party, also known as the Socialist Party.
 Unified Progressive Party, political party from 2011 to 2014.
 Progressive Party (South Korea, 2017)

See also 
 New Progressive Party (South Korea), also known as the Labor Party since July 2013.
 Progressive Justice Party, also known as the Justice Party since July 2013.
 Minjudang (disambiguation)
 Nodongdang (disambiguation)